Pablo Castellanos Cámara (1917–1981) was a virtuoso pianist, conductor, and music teacher who held dual American and Mexican nationality.

Biography

Family Origins 
He was born in Los Angeles, California in 1917 while his family, originally from Mérida, Yucatán, were exiled due to the Mexican Revolution, a social uprising that threatened the traditional, landowning upper classes. He was the only son of Pablo Castellanos León and Hortensia Cámara Vales, both his parents were virtuoso pianists. 

His paternal grandfather was Pablo Castellanos Rejón, a lawyer and politician who had served as governor of Yucatán during the Caste Wars. Meanwhile, his maternal grandfather was Raymundo Cámara Luján, a business magnate and head of the Cámara clan, a "powerful family of the high Yucatecan aristocracy." The family had belonged to Spanish and Portuguese nobility before settling in the New World in the 16th century when their ancestor, Juan de la Cámara, became one of the main military commanders during the Spanish conquest of Yucatán before helping to found Mérida in 1542, serving at the city's first Chief-Constable (alguacil mayor), a position he later passed on to his son. During the viceregal period, the Cámara family had become one of the largest landowners in the Yucatán peninsula, marrying the descendants of other Spanish Conquistadores, including Francisco de Montejo, Álvar Núñez Cabeza de Vaca, Gaspar and Melchor Pachecho, among others. 

Several members of his close family had distinguished political careers. José María Pino Suárez, his uncle, served as vice-president of Mexico and was a key figure of the Mexican Revolution before being assassinated in February 1913 during the Ten Tragic Days. Shortly after these events, fearing persecution from the Huerta military dictatorship, the Castellanos Cámara family exiled themselves in the United States and France. Meanwhile, two of his uncles, Alfredo and Nicolás Cámara Vales, also served as governor of Quintana Roo and Yucatán, respectively. Agustín Vales Castillo, his great-uncle, was a business magnate who served as mayor of Mérida in the early 20th century. Similarly, Alfredo Pino Cámara, his first cousin, was an associate justice of the Supreme Court of Justice of the Nation. His second cousin, Ismael Moreno Pino, was the undersecretary of foreign affairs and ambassador, posted in Berlin, The Hague, Washington, D.C.,Geneva and New York City, among others. Fernando Cámara Barbachano, another second cousin, was a distinguished social anthropologist and museum director.

Education 
Castellanos began his musical studies in Los Angeles under his father, Pablo Castellanos León and Alexis Kall, the eminent Russian pianist. Afterward, following his father's footsteps, he continued his musical education at the Conservatoire de Paris and at the École Normale de Musique de Paris, studying under Alfred Cortot, with whom he studied on the recommendation of Manuel M. Ponce. In 1931, aged fourteen, he graduated with a diplôme d'Aptitude a l'Enseginement du Piano. He finished his studies at the Berlin Conservatory where he studied under Edwin Fischer and Max Seiffert.

Career 
On returning to Mexico he offered concerts in the most important artistic forums in the country, in whose programs he premiered several works by Mexican authors.

He was a professor of piano and history of music in Mexico at the National Conservatory of Music and at the National School of Music at the National University of Mexico (UNAM). He trained prominent pianists such as Carlos Barajas, Paolo Mello and Lucero Enríquez.

He was the author of a large number of writings (some published, others unpublished), mainly on the history of music dedicating a large part of his life to this endeavor. One of these works was Horizons of Pre-Colombian Music (In Spanish: "horizontes de la música precortesiana") published by Fondo de Cultura Económica in 1980. He also made a compilation of writing on the work of Manuel M. Ponce, revised by Paolo Mello and published by UNAM.

Castellanos became a full member of the Mexican Culture Seminar (Seminario de Cultura Mexicana), which "is made up of eminent people in the areas of science, humanities and culture who share their knowledge through conferences, workshops, concerts, and exhibitions." on October 5, 1967.

In 1998, the daughters of Castellanos donated their father's private library to the National School of Music at UNAM, which includes his books, sheet music, microfiche, record collection (78 and 33 revolutions), tapes, and his square piano.

Private life 
In April 1942, he married Elena Schneider. The couple had two daughters: Paulina and Martha.

Works 

 Horizons of Pre-Colombian Music (In Spanish: "horizontes de la música precortesiana") published by Fondo de Cultura Económica in 1980.

References

1917 births
1981 deaths
20th-century American conductors (music)
20th-century American pianists
American male classical pianists
American male conductors (music)
American music educators
Mexican classical pianists
Mexican conductors (music)
Mexican music educators
Mexican expatriates in France
Mexican expatriates in the United States